The World Cities Culture Forum is a network of local governments and cultural sector leaders from 39 world cities.

History 

The World Cities Culture Forum was established in London in 2012 with eight cities (London, New York City, Tokyo, Shanghai, Paris, Istanbul, Sydney and Johannesburg) convened by the Mayor of London.

Member Cities 

The World Cities Culture Forum has 39 participating member cities across six geographic regions.

 Africa:
  - Lagos
  - Dakar
  - Cape Town
 East Asia:
  - Chengdu
  - Nanjing
  - Shanghai
  - Shenzhen
  - Hong Kong
  - Tokyo
  - Seoul
  - Taipei
 South Asia:
  -Mumbai
 Europe:
  - Vienna
  - Brussels
  - Helsinki
  - Paris
  - Dublin
  - Rome
  - Milan
  - Amsterdam
  - Oslo
  - Warsaw
  - Lisbon
  - Moscow
  - Stockholm
  - Zurich
  - Istanbul
  - London
  - Edinburgh
 Latin America:
  - Buenos Aires
  - Bogotá
 North America:
  - Montreal
  - Toronto
  - Austin
  - Los Angeles
  - New York City
  - San Francisco
 Southeast Asia & Oceania:
  - Melbourne
  - Sydney
  - Singapore

Governance 

The World Cities Culture Forum is convened by Justine Simons, Deputy Mayor for Culture and Creative Industries, Greater London Authority, at the request of the Mayor of London.

The activities of the World Cities Culture Forum are organised and delivered by BOP Consulting, a specialist consulting firm, on behalf of the Greater London Authority and the members of the Forum.

In 2016, the World Cities Culture Forum set up two advisory committees in order to involve members in co-designing its programme and research. There is an Event Advisory Committee and a Research Advisory Committee with five different cities represented on each committee.

World Cities Culture Summit 

Each year, members of the World Cities Culture Forum meet at the three-day World Cities Culture Summit. The Summit is an opportunity for members to share best practice.

The event is by invitation only. Two delegates from each member city – deputy mayors, senior policymakers or advisors in culture – are invited to attend.

Previous Summits have taken place in San Francisco, Seoul, Moscow, London, Shanghai, Amsterdam, Istanbul and Buenos Aires.

The 2019 World Cities Culture Summit will take place in Lisbon.

Research and Publications 

Underpinning the World Cities Culture Forum’s work is an extensive programme of research and publications.

The World Cities Culture Report is the network’s flagship publication. It is a compendium of data and innovative policies in cities, providing an analysis of comparative data and identifying emerging issues. It is published on a triennial basis. The first version of this report was launched in London during the 2012 Summer Olympics. The latest edition of the World Cities Culture Report was published in November 2018.

The World Cities Culture Forum Policy & Practice Series highlight members’ best practice initiatives on specific topics. The most recent publications of this series are the ‘Making Space for Culture Handbook for City Leaders’, a series of case studies to help policymakers better understand the options available to protect and develop cultural spaces, and the ‘Culture and Climate Change Handbook for City Leaders’, a report about the ways in which cities can integrate environmental sustainability into cultural policymaking.

The World Cities Culture Finance Report is the first comparative analysis of culture financing in world cities. It was first published in 2017 and is updated on an annual basis.

Online database 

The World Cities Culture Forum database is a comprehensive database on culture in world cities. It contains over 70 indicators on cultural infrastructure and cultural consumption in member world cities

Leadership Exchange 

A new World Cities Culture Forum Leadership Exchange Programme was created in 2017. The programme supports direct exchanges of learning between member cities through in-depth exchange visits. It is funded by Bloomberg Philanthropies and Google Arts & Culture.

References

External links 
 Official Website

International organisations based in London